Kalaka may refer to:
Kaláka, Hungarian folk music group
Kalaka (state constituency), represented in the Sarawak State Legislative Assembly